W. Graham (Jack) Jackson (1898-1984) was one of the four founders of the Delaware Valley-based automotive parts retailer The Pep Boys – Manny, Moe & Jack. After mustering out of the Navy in 1921 he and three friends from World War I, Maurice "Moe" Strauss, Emanuel "Manny" Rosenfeld and Moe Radavitz, chipped in $200 a piece to open their auto parts supply store on 63rd and Market Streets in Philadelphia, Pennsylvania.

Reportedly, even though the company and one of the three logo caricatures still bears his name Jack's likeness was replaced with that of Moe's brother, Isaac (Izzy) Strauss after Jackson left Pep Boys in mid-1920s.

References

American businesspeople in retailing
1898 births
1984 deaths